The 1905 Tulane Olive and Blue football team represented Tulane University during the 1905 Southern Intercollegiate Athletic Association football season.

Schedule

References

Tulane
Tulane Green Wave football seasons
College football winless seasons
Tulane Olive and Blue football